HD 170873, also known as HR 6954 or rarely 19 G. Telescopii, is a solitary orange-hued star located in the southern constellation Telescopium. It has an apparent magnitude of 6.20, placing it near the limit for naked eye visibility. At its current distance, HD 170873's brightness is diminished by 0.39 magnitudes due to interstellar dust, and it has an absolute magnitude of −0.31.

HD 170873 is an evolved red giant with a stellar classification of K2 III. It has 3.2 times the mass of the Sun but at the age of 318 million years, it has expanded to 22.6 times the Sun's radius. It has a near-solar metallicity at [Fe/H] = −0.01 and spins too slowly for its projected rotational velocity to be measured accurately.

References

K-type giants
Telescopium (constellation)
Telescopii, 19
CD-52 08714
170873
091062
6954